Carnamoyle is a townland in Inishowen, County Donegal, Ireland.

Running inland from the outskirts of the village of Muff to the slopes of the Inish Owen hills the townland is agricultural in nature.

References 

Townlands of County Donegal